The Udānavarga is an early Buddhist collection of topically organized chapters of aphoristic verses or "utterances" (Sanskrit: udāna) attributed to the Buddha and his disciples.  While not part of the Pali Canon, the Udānavarga has many chapter titles, verses and an overall format similar to those found in the Pali Canon's Dhammapada and Udāna.  At this time, there exist one Sanskrit recension, two Chinese recensions and two or three Tibetan recensions of the Udānavarga.

Content 
The Udānavarga has around 1100 verses in 33 chapters.  The chapter titles are:
 Anityavarga
 Kāmavarga
 Tṛṣṇāvarga
 Apramādavarga
 Priyavarga
 Śīlavarga
 Sucaritavarga
 Vācavarga
 Karmavarga
 Śraddhāvargas
 Śramaṇavarga
 Mārgavarga
 Satkāravarga
 Drohavarga
 Smṛtivarga
 Prakirṇakavarga
 Udakavarga
 Puṣpavarga
 Aśvavarga
 Krodhavarga
 Tathāgatavarga
 Śrutavarga
 Ātmavarga
 Peyālavarga
 Mitravarga
 Nirvāṇavarga
 Paśyavarga
 Pāpavarga
 Yugavarga
 Sukhavarga
 Cittavarga
 Bhikṣuvarga
 Brāhmaṇavarga

Comparatively, the most common version of the Dhammapada, in Pali, has 423 verses in 26 chapters.  Comparing the Udānavarga, Pali Dhammapada and the Gandhari Dharmapada, Brough (2001) identifies that the texts have in common 330 to 340 verses, 16 chapter headings and an underlying structure.

History 
The Udānavarga is attributed by Brough to the Sarvāstivādins.

Hinüber suggests that a text similar to the Pali Canon's Udāna formed the original core of the Sanskrit Udānavarga, to which verses from the Dhammapada were added.   Brough allows for the hypothesis that the Udānavarga, the Pali Dhammapada and the Gandhari Dharmapada all have a "common ancestor" but underlines that there is no evidence that any one of these three texts might have been the "primitive Dharmapada" from which the other two evolved.

The Tibetan Buddhist and Chinese Buddhist canons' recensions are traditionally said to have been compiled by Dharmatrāta.

See also 
 Dhammapada 
 Udana

Notes

References

Citations

Sources 

 Ānandajoti Bhikkhu (2nd rev., 2007).  A Comparative Edition of the Dhammapada, Pali text with parallels from Sanskritised Prakrit 
 Bernhard, Franz (ed.) (1965). Udānavarga. Göttingen: Vandenhoek & Ruprecht.  Retrieved 2008-09-18 in an expanded format by Ānandajoti Bhikkhu (version 2.1, January 2006) from "Ancient Buddhist Texts" at http://www.ancient-buddhist-texts.net/Buddhist-Texts/S1-Udanavarga/index.htm.
 
 Hinüber, Oskar von (2000). A Handbook of Pāli Literature. Berlin: Walter de Gruyter. .

Further reading 
 nandajoti Bhikkhu, trans. (2008). Udāna (Khuddakanikāya 3) Exalted Utterances, 2nd rev.
 Rockhill, William Woodville, trans. (1883). Udānavarga: a collection of verses from the Buddhist canon compiled by Dharmatrāta being the Northern Buddhist version of Dhammapada / transl. from the Tibetan of the Bkah-hgyur, with notes and extracts from the commentary of Pradjnāvarman. London: Trübner
 Willemen, Charles (1974), Dharmapada: a concordance to Udānavarga, Dhammapada, and the Chinese Dharmapada literature, Publications de l'Institut Belge des hautes etudes bouddhiques, Bruxelles

External links 
 "The Dhammapada (translation)".  Theosophy Library.
 "The Comparative Dhammapada". The Pāḷi Dhammapada and all the parallels in Middle Indo-Aryan
 "The Udanavarga". The Udānavarga (Sanskrit)
 Multilingual edition of Udānavarga in the Bibliotheca Polyglotta

Early Buddhist texts